Chastelet was a castle located beside Jacob's Ford, a ford of the upper Jordan River in Israel. The castle was built during the Crusades by the Knights Templar and the forces of the Kingdom of Jerusalem but was destroyed by the army of Saladin in 1179.

Etymology
The name of the castle comes from the French word châtelet, meaning a fortified gatehouse. Jacob's Ford is also known by the Latin name of Vadum Iacob and in modern Hebrew as Ateret.

History
The castle was intended to act as a bulwark against Muslim incursions into the Kingdom of Jerusalem and to strength protection for pilgrims and traders through Christian Palestine. Jointly constructed by the Knights Templar and the Kingdom of Jerusalem under orders of Baldwin IV of Jerusalem, construction of the castle began in 1178. By May 1179, the main walls (built of lime, stone and pebbles) and foundations were completed, which included a perimeter wall with five gates, and a tower.

Some 1,500 men were camped at the fortress when Saladin began an initial attack that was repulsed in June. In an effort to further reinforce the castle forces and meet the Muslim army, Christian forces were decisively defeated at the Battle of Marj Ayyun. As a result, in August 1179 the forces of Saladin were able to lay siege to the castle during the Siege of Jacob's Ford. A heavy intense siege resulted in the fall of the barbican (gatehouse) but the castle held for several days until miners succeeded digging a tunnel that brought down the main tower. Saladins forces then successfully took the castle. The surviving defenders were executed and the armoury was seized, including some 1,000 coats of armour and the castle was extensively demolished to prevent further use by the Christian forces.

In the 20th and early 21st centuries, the castle has been the site of extensive archaeological excavations. These included the discovery of extensive double-chambered baking ovens. Notably, over 160 coins of various types have also been found providing a key source of coins from the Frankish crusading era.

References

Castles in Israel
Castles and fortifications of the Kingdom of Jerusalem
Buildings and structures demolished in the 12th century